Doliracetam is a nootropic drug (cognition enhancer) from the racetam family used in treatment of
epilepsy.

According to the Hoechst patent title, it has neuroanabolic action.

See also
 Piracetam

References 

Racetams
Acetamides
Indolines
Lactams
Oxindoles